Mathieu de Dombasle (1777-1843) was a French agronomist. He was one of the first French farmers to grow beetroots to producer sugar, until he went bankrupt. He invented the Dombasle plough, and he established a model farm in Roville-devant-Bayon. He was the author of many books about agriculture.

Early life
Mathieu de Dombasle was born on 26 February 1777 in Nancy, France. He served in the French Army.

Career
De Dombasle grew beetroots in Monplaisir near Nancy to produce sugar as early as 1809. He was one of the first farmers to grow beetroots for this purpose in France. Five years later, in 1814, he went bankrupt, as the new tariffs made sugarcane more profitable. He subsequently wrote several essays about sugar.

De Dombasle invented the "Dombasle plough," based on the works of Albrecht Thaer. He organized agrarian fairs, where he demonstrated the plough.

De Dombasle was the co-founder of the Société centrale d’agriculture with Antoine Bertier, and he served as its founding president from 1820 to 1825. Meanwhile, the two men established a model farm in Roville-devant-Bayon in 1821-1822.

De Dombasle became an Officer of the Legion of Honour.

Death and legacy
De Dombasle died on 27 December 1843 in Nancy, France. His grandson, Charles de Meixmoron de Dombasle, who became a painter, edited three of his books and published them posthumously in 1861-1862.

Works

Further reading

References

1777 births
1843 deaths
Scientists from Nancy, France
French agronomists
French non-fiction writers
Officiers of the Légion d'honneur